Alina Eduardivna Gorlova (b. 1992) is a Ukrainian filmmaker, director, and screenwriter, specialising in documentaries.

Education
Gorlova studied at the Kyiv National I. K. Karpenko-Kary Theatre, Cinema and Television University from 2008 to 2012.

Filmography
 2012: The First Step in the Clouds
 2014: Babushka
 2016: 
 2017: Invisible Battalion, documentary, co-directed with Iryna Tsilyk and Svetlana Lishchynska
 2018: No Obvious Signs, documentary (with score by Ptakh Jung)
 2020: This Rain Will Never Stop, documentary

References

External links
 

Living people
1992 births
People from Zaporizhzhia
Ukrainian women film directors
Ukrainian documentary film directors
Ukrainian screenwriters
Kyiv National I. K. Karpenko-Kary Theatre, Cinema and Television University alumni
Women screenwriters